Loxophlebia is a genus of moths in the subfamily Arctiinae. The genus was erected by Arthur Gardiner Butler in 1876.

Species
The genus includes the following species:

References

External links

 
Euchromiina
Moth genera